Eumasia crisostomella is a moth in the Psychidae family. It is found in Portugal.

The wingspan is 7–8 mm. The forewing ground colour is yellowish, with a distinct dark brown spot at one-half of the posterior margin and partly the anterior margin with some very narrow dark brown spots. The distal third is significantly spotted and converges partially to transverse lines. The hindwings are uniform dark grey.

References

Psychidae
Moths described in 1957
Taxa named by Hans Georg Amsel